Nemesh Girishchandra Patel (born 8 October 1976) is an English cricketer.  Patel is a right-handed batsman who bowls right-arm off break.  He was born in Leicester, Leicestershire.

Patel represented the Leicestershire Cricket Board in List A cricket.  His debut List A match came against Hertfordshire in the 1999 NatWest Trophy.  From 1999 to 2002, he represented the Board in 7 List A matches, the last of which came against the Kent Cricket Board in the 2nd round of the 2003 Cheltenham & Gloucester Trophy which was played in 2002.  In his 7 List A matches, he scored 139 runs at a batting average of 23.16, with a single half century high score of 62*.  With the ball he took 4 wickets at a bowling average of 48.59, with best figures of 2/30.

He currently plays club cricket for Loughborough Town Cricket Club in the Leicestershire Premier Cricket League.

References

External links
Nemesh Patel at Cricinfo
Nemesh Patel at CricketArchive

1976 births
Living people
Cricketers from Leicester
English cricketers
Leicestershire Cricket Board cricketers
British sportspeople of Indian descent
British Asian cricketers